Griphoneura is a genus of flies in the family Lauxaniidae. There are about 8 described species in Griphoneura.

Species
These 8 species belong to the genus Griphoneura:
 G. affinis Malloch, 1925
 G. alboapicata Malloch, 1925
 G. ferruginea Schiner, 1868
 G. imbuta Wiedemann, 1830
 G. nigricornis Curran, 1938
 G. proxima Hendel, 1926
 G. tarsalis Curran, 1938
 G. triangulata Hendel, 1926

References

Lauxaniidae
Lauxanioidea genera